Vyacheslav Aleksandrovich Malafeev (born 4 March 1979) is a Russian football official and a former player who played as a goalkeeper. He is a one-club man, having spent all 17 of his professional seasons with Zenit. He worked as an assistant director of sports for Zenit from 2016 to 2020.

Club career
Vyacheslav Malafeev started attending the Smena football school at the age of nine. In 1997, he began to play for the farm club of FC Zenit, Zenit-2, in the Third Division. He got the chance to play for Zenit in the Premier League in 1999 during the suspension of Roman Berezovsky. Malafeev later became the first choice goalkeeper for Zenit in 2001, after Berezovsky left the club. Malafeev eventually became the first-choice goalkeeper ahead of Kamil Čontofalský and won the UEFA Cup in 2008 after keeping a clean sheet against Rangers in the final.

International career
 On 19 November 2003, Malafeev debuted as a goalkeeper for the national team in a Euro 2004 qualifiers play-off against Wales. He was chosen as the second choice goalkeeper behind Sergei Ovchinnikov and ahead of Igor Akinfeev. Malafeev participated in Euro 2004 coming on after Ovchinnikov's red card against Portugal and starting against Greece.

After Euro 2004, Malafeev, became the first choice goalkeeper for Russia succeeding Ovchinnikov. After a long-term injury in May 2005, Malafeev lost his place in the goal for Zenit and Russia to Kamil Čontofalský and Igor Akinfeev, respectively. In 2007, played in two Euro 2008 qualifiers against Andorra and Croatia after Akinfeev's long-term injury but was relegated to the bench in favor of Vladimir Gabulov. After Zenit's successful UEFA Cup campaign he lost a narrow battle with Igor Akinfeev for the first choice goalkeeper spot in Russia's Euro 2008 squad. Nonetheless, he stayed on as the second choice goalkeeper ahead of Gabulov.

He was the starting goalkeeper in the game that Russia lost to Portugal with a score of 1–7 in the 2006 FIFA World Cup qualifier.

He was confirmed for the finalized UEFA Euro 2012 squad on 25 May 2012. After the UEFA Euro 2012 he announced that he is retiring from the national team to spend more time with his children, but is prepared to be called up in case of emergency such as injuries to other top goalkeepers.

Coaching career
In June 2020 it was announced that he was appointed to the management club of the FC Dynamo Saint Petersburg.

Career statistics

Personal life
Vyacheslav and his wife Marina had two children: Ksenia and Maxim. Marina Malafeeva died in a car crash on the morning of 17 March 2011, aged 37. His second wife is Ekaterina Malafeeva, they married in December 2012 and broke up in September 2021. They also have a child named Alex.

Honours

Club
Zenit
 Russian Premier League: 2007, 2010, 2011–12, 2014–15
 Russian Cup: 1998–99, 2009–10
 Russian Premier League Cup: 2003
 Russian Super Cup: 2008, 2011
 UEFA Cup: 2007–08
 UEFA Super Cup: 2008

International
Russia
 UEFA European Championship bronze medalist: 2008

References

External links 
 Profile at the official FC Zenit St. Petersburg website 
 
  
 Russia – Record International Players

1979 births
Footballers from Saint Petersburg
Living people
Russian footballers
Russia under-21 international footballers
Russia international footballers
FC Zenit Saint Petersburg players
UEFA Cup winning players
UEFA Euro 2004 players
Russian Premier League players
UEFA Euro 2008 players
UEFA Euro 2012 players
Association football goalkeepers
FC Zenit-2 Saint Petersburg players